The 2011 Central and Western District Council election was held in Central and Western District, Hong Kong on 6 November 2011 to elect all 15 elected members to the 18-member District Council.

The pro-Beijing Democratic Alliance for the Betterment and Progress of Hong Kong took over the Democratic Party as the largest party in the council, with the Democrats losing two seats by narrow margin in Belcher and Tung Wah. Civic Party's Tanya Chan the incumbent Legislative Councillor also lost her seat in Peak to Liberal Party's Joseph Chan Ho-lim.

Overall election results
Before election:

Change in composition:

Results by constituency

Belcher

Castle Road

Centre Street

Chung Wan

Kennedy Town & Mount Davis

Kwun Lung

Middle Levels East

Peak

Sai Wan

Sai Ying Pun

Shek Tong Tsui

Sheung Wan

Tung Wah

University

Water Street

References

2011 Hong Kong local elections
Central and Western District Council elections